Casper (with the same sounding  Kasper) is a family and personal name derived from Aramaic that means "Treasurer". The origins of the name have been traced as far back as the Old Testament and variations of the name have been adopted by a variety of cultures and languages.

Origins

The name is derived from Gaspar which in turn is from an ancient Chaldean word, "gizbar", which according to  Strong's Concordance means "treasurer". The word "gizbar" appears in the Hebrew version of the Old Testament Book of Ezra (1:8). In fact, the modern Hebrew word for "treasurer" is still "gizbar" (גזבר). By the 1st century B.C. the Septuagint gave a Greek translation of "gizbar" in Ezra 1:8 as "gasbarinou" (literally, "son of Gasbar"). The transition from "Gizbar" to "Caspar" and "Kaspar" can thus be summarized as: Gizbar→Gasbar→Gaspar→Caspar→Kaspar... with "C" being a misreading of the manuscript "G" and "K" having the same phonetic value as "C". 

There are numerous modern variations such as Gaspar (Catalan, Portuguese and Spanish), Gaspare (Italian), Gaspard (French), Kaspar (Dutch, German), Kašpar (Czech), Casper (Dutch, English), Caspar (Dutch), Kacper/Kasper (Polish), Kasperi (Finnish), Kasper (Danish, Swedish), Gáspár (Hungarian), Гаспар (Russian) and Kaspars (Latvian).

By the 6th century, the name "Gaspar" was recorded in mosaic at the Basilica of Sant'Apollinare Nuovo in Ravenna, Italy as one of the traditional names assigned by folklore to the anonymous Magi mentioned in the Gospel of Matthew account of the Nativity of Jesus. The letter "G" in the name Gaspar was clearly different from the letter "C" used elsewhere, suggesting that the name Gaspar preceded the name Caspar, and not the other way around as some have supposed.

The Western tradition of the name Gaspar also derives from an early 6th century Greek manuscript, translated into the Latin Excerpta latina barbari.  A Pseudo-Bedan text called Collectanea et Flores apparently continues the tradition of the name Caspar: "Secundus nomine Caspar" (P.L., XCIV, 541).  This text is said to be from the 8th or 9th century, of Irish origin. As a surname, Gaspar survives today in Italian, Spanish, Portuguese and French, although the French adds a silent d. It also survives in the Armenian name, Gasparian.

Use of the name in Europe

The basic names Gaspar, and its variants Caspar and Kaspar, along with Melchior and Balthazar or Balthasar, the other two saints, wisemen, and kings depicted in the above basilica became family names and spread throughout Europe. Eventually, there would be dozens of variations due to suffixes (e.g. "-son","-sen", "-ovitch", "-ski", etc.) and variations of spelling, pronunciation, and alphabets. For example, since "s"(Hungarian)="sh"(English)="sch"(German)="sz"(Polish), and since "s"(English, German, Dutch)="sz"(Hungarian), it is easy to see how Kaspar could become Kaschpar or Kaszpar. Some of them if written in Russian or Armenian would be totally unrecognizable if seen, but recognizable if heard.

In British and American English, the initial a in Gaspar, Kaspar, Caspar, etc. is now pronounced as in the word "hat", whereas in continental Europe, it remains as in the word "father". This, and other changes in English pronunciation, took place between 1200 AD and 1600 AD and are now known as the Great Vowel Shift. There were some exceptions: for example "Watt" and "Watson". 

Records indicate by the late 18th century a number of immigrants to the United States were changing the a to o in the first part of their names and -ar to -er in the last part, most likely to more closely approximate the continental European (rather than British) pronunciation. Examples include:

Caspar
Casper
Cosper
Gaspar
Gosper
Kaspar
Kasper
Kosper
Kacper

Individuals named Casper
Casper Ankergren (born 1979), Danish football goalkeeper
Casper Asbjornson (1909-1970), American Major League Baseball catcher
Casper ten Boom (1859-1944), Dutch watchmaker who aided Jews during the Holocaust
Casper Christensen (born 1968), Danish comedian
Casper Elgaard (born 1978), Danish auto racing driver
Casper Helling (born 1972), Danish speedskater, particularly in longer distances
Casper Henningsen (born 1985), Danish footballer
Casper Holstein (1876-1944), New York City gangster
Casper Jørgensen (born 1985), Danish racing cyclist
Casper Ulrich Mortensen (born 1989), Danish handball player
Casper Reardon (1907–1941), classical and jazz harpist
Casper Ruud (born 1998), Norwegian tennis player
Casper Sloth (born 1992), Danish footballer
Casper R. Taylor, Jr. (born 1934), American politician
Casper Van Dien (born 1968), American actor
Casper Wells (born 1984), Major League Baseball player
Casper Wollenhaupt (1755–1809), merchant and politician in Nova Scotia (now part of Canada)
Casper Yost (1863-1941), longtime editor of the St. Louis Globe-Democrat newspaper
Caspar David Friedrich (1774-1840), landscape painter in the German Romantic period

See also
Casper (surname)
Casper the Friendly Ghost

References